The New York Mets, founded in 1962, returned National League baseball to New York following the departure of the Brooklyn Dodgers to Los Angeles and the New York Giants to San Francisco. The Mets' uniform was designed to incorporate elements of both departed clubs, with the Dodgers' royal blue becoming the Mets' primary color and the Giants' orange the trim color, along with the Giants' "NY" crest adopted as the new team's cap logo. The original Mets uniform had a "clean and classic" look that, while it has undergone a number of changes over the course of the team's history, has never been substantially revised. The basic template has always been a conventional short-sleeved baseball uniform with "Mets" in cursive script on a white pinstriped home jersey, and either "NEW YORK" or "Mets" on a gray road jersey, with the lettering and numerals in blue outlined in orange. The most notable variations were the "racing stripe" uniforms of the 1980s and early '90s, and the addition of black as a trim color along with black alternate jerseys and caps that were worn from 1998 through 2011. For 2012, in recognition of its 50th Anniversary, the club restored its classic look by removing the black trim from all of its uniforms and phasing out the black jerseys and caps. Since then the club has adopted blue alternate jerseys and caps but has generally worn its primary uniform in most games, home and away.

Primary logo
The Mets' primary logo is a circular crest with an orange outline, containing a blue silhouetted representation of New York City's skyline against a white background, with the word "Mets" in orange cursive script outlined in white just below the center of the circle. At the bottom of the circle is a generic image of a suspension bridge in white, symbolizing the joining of New York's five boroughs. The skyline itself includes, from left to right, representations of a church spire (symbolizing Brooklyn, the "borough of churches"), the Williamsburgh Savings Bank building (tallest building in Brooklyn), the Woolworth Building, the Empire State Building, and the United Nations building. Superimposed over the skyline behind the "Mets" script are orange baseball stitches. The logo was designed by cartoonist Ray Gotto, creator of the Ozark Ike comic strip.

From 1962–1998, the logo had a small interlocking "NY" in block letters just to the left of the "Mets" wordmark.

Current game uniforms

Home uniforms
The primary home uniform for the Mets is a white uniform with blue pinstripes, a conventional button-down jersey with short sleeves, and tackle-twill lettering in royal blue outlined in orange. The jersey has the word "Mets" in cursive script across the chest, angled upward, with the player's number in sans-serif block numerals underneath the "-ets" script on the player's left side. On the back of the jersey is the player's number in sans-serif block numerals, with the player's name radially arched above it in block lettering, sewn directly onto the jersey. On the left sleeve is a circular embroidered patch depicting the Mets' primary logo.

The Mets' home uniforms are worn with blue socks, belts, and undersleeves.

Road uniforms
The road uniforms are grey with blue piping on the collar/placket and sleeve ends. Like the home uniforms, the road jerseys have blue tackle-twill lettering outlined in orange. The "NEW YORK" wordmark is radially arched across the chest, in Tiffany typeface, with the player's number below "YORK" on the player's left side. The uniform pants are grey with blue piping from the beltline to the cuff on each side. The road jerseys feature the same numerals, lettering and sleeve patch(es) as the home jersey, and the uniforms are also worn with blue socks, belts, and undersleeves.

Alternate uniforms
The Mets have two alternate home uniforms. One is a blue jersey with the "Mets" script, numerals and lettering in orange outlined in white, and orange piping on the collar/placket and sleeve ends (resembling the primary road jersey). This jersey is worn with either the pinstriped pants or plain white alternate pants with blue piping from hip to cuff on each side, and an alternate cap which has the orange "NY" logo crest outlined in white, but with no corresponding alternate batting helmet; the team uses its primary batting helmets with this uniform.

The other home alternate consists of a black jersey resembling the design worn in 1998, with the "Mets" script, numerals and lettering in blue outlined in white with an orange drop-shadow, and the primary-logo patch on the left sleeve, but without the blue collar/placket piping. This uniform includes the all-black alternate caps and batting helmets that debuted in 1999, and plain white pants with blue piping from hip to cuff on each side.

The blue alternate road uniform that debuted in 2013, with the silver/grey "NEW YORK" wordmark and graphics outlined in orange, has been discontinued for 2022.

Caps

The Mets' cap, worn at home and on the road, is blue with an orange interlocking "NY" crest on the front panel, and an orange button on top of the crown. The curlicue-style crest is essentially the same as that used by the New York Giants before that franchise relocated to San Francisco following the 1957 season.

The Mets' batting helmets match the primary cap in color and design. In 2020, the orange "NY" logo decal was given a metallic sheen.

Uniform history

Standard uniforms

1962–77: Original design

The original Mets uniforms from 1962 were of essentially the same design as the team's current primary home and road uniforms. The home uniform was white with blue pinstripes, "Mets" script in blue outlined in orange angled upward across the chest, with the player's number on the back of the jersey in blue block numerals outlined in orange, but no player name on the back and no numerals on the front. The cap was blue with the orange "NY" crest on the front panel, the same as the current cap but with a blue button on top of the crown. The road uniform also resembled the current road grays, with "NEW YORK" in Tiffany lettering radially arched across the chest, blue placket piping, and also with no player name on the back, no numerals on the front, and no piping on the sleeves. The primary logo appeared as a patch on the left sleeve of the road jersey in 1962, then was added to the home jersey in 1963.

Apart from the addition of numerals to the front of the jerseys in 1965, underneath the wordmark on the player's left side, and some variations to the numeral typeface, this uniform remained largely unchanged through 1973. A special New York World's Fair patch was worn on the left sleeve in 1964 and '65, in place of the Mets' primary logo. In 1969 the logo patch was supplanted by a patch commemorating the 100th Anniversary of Major League Baseball.

In 1974, the "Mets" script replaced the "NEW YORK" wordmark on the road jersey. The home uniform was unchanged.

On a few occasions in 1976, the Mets wore special "pillbox" caps that had a cylindrical (as opposed to hemispherical) crown and three thin orange horizontal stripes around the cap.

1978–82: Pullovers and player names
In 1978, the home and road jerseys changed from conventional button-down jerseys to Henley-style pullover jerseys, with two buttons just below the collar. The blue piping was removed from the road jerseys. Three thin stripes (blue-orange-blue) were added to the sleeve cuffs and collar on both home and road jerseys.

In 1979, player names were added to the back of the jerseys, radially arched above the number in blue block letters outlined in orange. The letters were sewn onto an arched fabric "nameplate" (white on the home jerseys, grey on the road jerseys) that was in turn sewn onto the jersey itself.

1982–92: Racing stripes

In 1982, the primary logo patch was removed from the left sleeve of both jerseys, and the road uniforms added thick "racing stripes" (blue with orange borders) on the shoulders from neck to sleeve cuff, on the sides of the jerseys from the armpit to the hip, and on the sides of the pants from the beltline to the cuff; the collar and sleeve-cuff striping were removed. The two-button collar was replaced by a gray V-neck. The home jerseys received the same treatment in 1983, adding the "racing stripes" along with a blue V-neck.

From 1982–84, the team occasionally wore blue alternate jerseys on the road. The 1982 blue jersey, worn only rarely, had the "Mets" script, numerals and lettering in orange with white outline, and orange-blue-orange striping on the collar and sleeve cuffs. For 1983–84, the road blue alternate had the "Mets" script, numerals and lettering in grey with an orange outline, and orange-white-orange collar and sleeve striping.

In 1986, the team wore a special 25th Anniversary patch on the left sleeve, over the "racing stripes".

In 1987, the nameplates were eliminated and the letters of the players' names were sewn directly onto the jerseys. The collar on the road jerseys was changed from gray to blue, and the "Mets" script was replaced with "New York" in cursive script. This was replaced in 1988 by "NEW YORK" in radially-arched block letters (matching the names on the back), with no front numerals. Also in 1988, a thin white outline was added to the wordmark, numerals, lettering, and "racing stripes" on the road jerseys.

In 1991, the pullover jerseys became button-down jerseys, resulting in the elimination of the blue collars, and a thin white outline was added to the graphics on the home jerseys.

In 1992, the team wore a patch on the left sleeve, over the "racing stripes", consisting of a white circle with black outline, pinstripes, and the letter "S" in honor of the late William A. Shea, the New York attorney who was instrumental in bringing National League baseball back to New York, and for whom Shea Stadium was named.

1993–94: The "swoosh-tail"

In 1993, the color blue used on the Mets uniforms was changed to a slightly darker shade. The "racing stripes" were removed from both home and road uniforms, and the primary logo returned to the left sleeve. The "Mets" script on the home jersey was modified, and for the first time incorporated a "swoosh-tail" attached to the letter "s" underlining the wordmark. The road jersey had "New York" in cursive script, similar but not identical to the script used in 1987, and also with a "swoosh-tail" attached to the letter "k" underlining the wordmark. The road uniform had thin blue-orange-blue piping on the sleeve cuffs and on the sides of the pants from the beltline to the cuff.

In 1994, player numerals were added to the front of the road jersey, below the wordmark on the player's left side, and the piping was removed from the road uniform. Also in 1994, the primary-logo sleeve patch was modified to incorporate rectangular spaces above and below the circle, containing text commemorating the 25th anniversary of the 1969 "Miracle Mets." On the right sleeve was a patch, worn league-wide, commemorating the 125th Anniversary of Major League Baseball.

1995–97: Back to basics
The Mets returned to their traditional uniform design in 1995. The original "Mets" script was restored to the home jersey; the road jersey eliminated the white outlining, revived the original "NEW YORK" wordmark and blue placket piping, and added blue piping to the sleeve ends.

In 1997, the blue button on the top of the caps was changed to orange. The Mets introduced an alternate home uniform that was plain white with no pinstripes, and blue piping matching the road uniform. The team also introduced an alternate cap with a white crown and blue bill. The "NY" crest on the alternate cap was blue with an orange outline, and the button on top of the cap was blue. The white cap was worn with the white alternate jersey on some occasions early in the season. Also in 1997, the team wore a patch on the right sleeve of all three jerseys commemorating the 50th anniversary of Jackie Robinson's breaking of Major League Baseball's color barrier.

1998–2011: Mets in black
In 1998, a black alternate jersey was introduced, matching the white home alternate in style but with the "Mets" script, numerals and lettering in blue with a white outline and an orange drop-shadow. The black jersey was worn as an alternate at home, paired with the white home alternate pants, and on the road. The team also introduced a black alternate cap with a blue bill, blue button on top, and "NY" crest in blue outlined in orange, to be worn with the black jerseys. The white alternate cap from 1997 was discontinued. A black drop-shadow was added to the script, numerals and lettering on the home white alternate and road gray jerseys.

In 1999, the black drop-shadow was added to the graphics on the home pinstriped uniforms, and a road version of the black alternate jersey (with the "NEW YORK" wordmark) was introduced. An alternate version of the Mets' primary logo, with a black skyline and "Mets" script in blue outlined in white with orange drop-shadow, was also introduced in 1999 and worn on the left sleeve of both black alternate jerseys. A second black alternate cap was added, this one with a black bill, black top-button, and "NY" crest in blue outlined in white with orange drop-shadow (matching the graphics on the black jerseys). This became commonly known as the "solid black cap" or "all-black cap" while the 1998 black alternate cap, which was retained, became known as the "two-tone cap" or "hybrid cap" thanks to its blue bill. Also in 1999, for that season only, the player names were removed from the back of all three home jerseys.

Although the Mets continued to officially designate the pinstriped uniform as the club's primary home uniform, and the blue cap with the orange crest as the primary cap, the reality of what was worn on the field from 1998 through 2009 was quite different. At some point during the 1998 season, the team began occasionally pairing the two-tone cap, which was designed to be worn with the black jerseys, with the white alternate jerseys and gray road uniforms as well. By the end of the 1998 season the two-tone cap had become the team's de facto road cap and was frequently worn at home with the white alternates as well as the black, but not with the pinstripes which still had no black trim. After 1998, the blue cap was worn only rarely and exclusively at home; the road gray jerseys were paired exclusively (except for one game in 2008) with the two-tone cap, and the black jerseys (home and road) were paired exclusively with the all-black cap. Although the home pinstriped and white uniforms were paired at various times with all three caps, in most home games during this period the team wore the white alternate uniform with the two-tone cap. All five uniforms were worn with black socks, belts, and undersleeves; the blue accessories appeared only with the blue caps. In addition, beginning in 2001 when the two-tone cap was designated as the official road cap and until it was discontinued after the 2011 season, the Mets were the only team in MLB to wear its designated road cap at home.

In 2001, following the terrorist attacks of September 11, when play resumed and for the balance of the season all MLB teams including the Mets had an American flag patch sewn onto the back of the collar of all game jerseys. The Mets added embroidery to the right sleeve cuff of all five jerseys showing the phrase "9-11-01" flanked by two American flags. In addition, beginning September 21 at their first home game after the attacks, the Mets wore caps of New York City's first-responder agencies—the Police Department (NYPD), Fire Department (FDNY), Emergency Medical Services (EMS) and Port Authority Police (PAPD)—in place of their regular game caps. The Mets were only permitted to wear these caps during pre-game warmups on September 21 but defied MLB instructions and wore them in game play, that night and for the remainder of the season. All of the first-responder caps were navy blue, with either "NYPD" in white serif lettering, "FDNY" in thick yellow-orange-red gradient lettering, or the EMS or PAPD shield logo on the front. Typically, each player and coach chose one of the caps and wore that same one for the balance of the season.

In 2002, the Mets wore a patch on the right sleeve commemorating the club's 40th Anniversary. The "9-11-01" sleeve embroidery was carried over from the previous season.

In 2004, the Mets wore a patch on the right sleeve commemorating the 40th Anniversary of Shea Stadium. Below this patch, embroidered onto the sleeve in black lettering on the pinstriped, white and gray jerseys and white lettering on the black jerseys, was the phrase "Ya Gotta Believe" and the name "TUG", in honor of former Mets pitcher Tug McGraw who died on January 5. Also in 2004, the name of longtime Mets broadcaster Bob Murphy was embroidered on the left sleeve above the primary logo patch after Murphy died on August 3.

Prior to 2006, throughout Mets history, the team's batting helmets were designed to match the caps. The 1976 "pillbox" cap had no corresponding batting helmet, nor did the 1997 white alternate cap (although first baseman John Olerud and catcher Todd Hundley wore white helmets on the field); the team used its standard batting helmets (matching the primary caps) in all games. Beginning in 1998, each alternate cap had a matching corresponding batting helmet with the same crown and bill colors, and the same "NY" logo crest applied as a decal on the front of the helmet. In 2006, however, the club began using the Rawlings Coolflo batting helmet, and changed the design of the two-tone helmet such that the cap and helmet no longer matched. The helmet shell was black; the bill and the front of the crown were painted metallic blue, the area of which conformed to the surface contours of the helmet shell and faded gradually toward the back. The "NY" crest on the front of this helmet was black with a white outline and orange drop-shadow. The blue and all-black helmets received the same metallic paint treatment as the two-tone helmet, but still essentially matched the respective caps as the metallic paint was the same color as the helmet shell and the "NY" logo decals matched the crests on the corresponding caps.

In 2008, the Mets wore a patch on the right sleeve denoting the final season of Shea Stadium. For the team's final home series at Shea in late September, the patch was embroidered on the left side of the caps. Also in 2008, for the first game of a doubleheader on June 27 against the Yankees at Yankee Stadium, the Mets wore blue caps and accessories with the road gray uniforms for the first time since 1998. This combination would not appear again until the black trim, caps, and accessories were eliminated for the 2012 season.

In 2009, the Mets wore a patch on the right sleeve of their home jerseys to mark the opening of their new ballpark, Citi Field. A different Inaugural Season logo for Citi Field was placed on the left side of the caps, worn at home and on the road. Neither logo patch contained the name of the ballpark, in deference to MLB rules prohibiting corporate names or logos (other than those of the uniform manufacturer) from appearing on the uniform; similar logos containing the name "Citi Field" were designed and used in publications, signage and other contexts. Also in 2009, the road ("NEW YORK") version of the black alternate jersey was discontinued, although the home ("Mets") version continued to be worn as an alternate in road games as well as at home.

In 2010, the home white alternate uniform was re-designated as the primary home uniform. The pinstriped uniform was re-designated as an alternate, with the fabric base color changed from white to off-white/cream. This uniform was paired exclusively with the blue cap, which was still the designated home cap and was worn somewhat more often in 2010 and 2011 than it had been from 1998–2009, but still only at home.

2012–present: Back to basics, again
In 2012, the black drop-shadow was removed from all of the team's jersey graphics, and the two-tone cap was discontinued. The off-white/cream-colored pinstriped uniform became the primary home uniform, the white uniform became the home alternate, the blue cap with orange crest became the sole uniform cap for both home and road games, and all three uniforms were worn with blue socks, belts and undersleeves. The metallic paint treatment on the batting helmets was discontinued. The black jerseys and all-black caps were retained but worn only twice, on occasions honoring former players Edgardo Alfonzo and John Franco who wore them during significant portions of their Mets careers. A special 50th Anniversary logo patch supplanted the primary logo patch on the left sleeve of the home, alternate and road jerseys, was added to the right sleeve of the black jerseys, and was also embroidered on the back of the caps. A memorial patch for former Mets catcher and Hall of Famer Gary Carter was worn on the right sleeve of the home, alternate and road jerseys, and on the front of the black jerseys by the player's right shoulder. This patch was black, in the shape of home plate, with "KID" (Carter's nickname) above "8" (Carter's number) in white lettering.

In 2013, the Mets hosted the All-Star Game, and wore a corresponding logo patch on the left sleeve of their jerseys, supplanting the primary logo for another year. The team also added blue home and road alternate jerseys to its uniform rotation. The blue home jersey has the "Mets" script, numerals and lettering in orange outlined in white, and orange placket and sleeve piping, and was worn with the white home alternate pants. The road version has the "NEW YORK" wordmark, numerals, and lettering in grey outlined in orange. Also in 2013, the club introduced an alternate cap with a blue crown, orange bill, and "NY" logo crest in orange outlined in white, but with no corresponding alternate batting helmet. This alternate cap was worn occasionally at home, with either the blue or white alternate jerseys. The black alternate jerseys were not worn at all in 2013, despite indications that the club might retain them for special occasions as it did in 2012, and thus were finally phased out.

In 2014, the blue alternate jerseys were given a new left-sleeve patch depicting the Mets' mascot, "Mr. Met", in a running pose facing to the left of the viewer toward the front of the jersey. The primary-logo patch returned to the left sleeve of the home pinstriped, white alternate and road gray jerseys after being supplanted for two years. Also in 2014, the Mets wore a patch on the right sleeve of all five jerseys honoring former longtime Mets broadcaster and baseball Hall of Famer Ralph Kiner, who died on February 6. The patch was a black circle with silver border and lettering, depicting a microphone at center with the name "RALPH KINER" circumscribed above and "1922–2014" below.

In addition, the Mets introduced a military-camouflage alternate jersey for 2014, to be worn in select Monday home games. This jersey had the regular home "Mets" script and numerals with no piping, and an American flag patch in place of the primary logo on the left sleeve. It was worn with a matching camouflage cap, with the "NY" logo crest in blue outlined in orange.

In September 2014, a revised version of the Mets' primary logo began to appear on the club's social media accounts, substituting the Citigroup Center for the United Nations building on the right side of the skyline. The club subsequently announced that the primary logo was not changing and the accounts reverted to the proper logo.

In 2015, the Mets changed the fabric base color of the home pinstriped uniform from off-white/cream to white, and discontinued the white alternate uniform. As a result, the blue home alternate jerseys were worn with the pinstriped pants. The club also added an alternate road cap, with a blue crown and bill and the "NY" logo in grey outlined in orange, matching the road blue alternate jersey; as with the home alternate cap, there is no corresponding alternate batting helmet.

In 2016, the Mets wore 1986 "throwback" uniforms in every Sunday home game, to mark the 30th anniversary of the club's last world championship. The uniform featured the same pullover jersey, blue collar, "racing stripes", and commemorative patch worn in 1986. The military-camouflage alternate jerseys and caps were discontinued.

For the 2017 season, the Mr. Met sleeve patch on the blue alternate jerseys was replaced by the standard primary-logo patch. The Mets also revised their home alternate cap, replacing the orange bill with a blue bill.

In 2018, beginning with the second game of the season on March 31, the Mets wore a memorial patch on the right sleeve of their jerseys to honor Rusty Staub, who died on March 29. The patch was a black circle with Staub's autograph (first name only) rendered in orange.

In 2020 the Mets made minor changes to their batting helmets, giving the orange "NY" logo decal a metallic sheen and removing the orange dot from the top of the crown. Beginning September 4, a memorial patch for Hall of Fame pitcher Tom Seaver, who died on August 31, was worn on the right sleeve of the Mets' jerseys; a black circle with white outline, and Seaver's number 41 in white. For the 2021 season the Mets wore a different Seaver tribute patch, this one a white circle with an orange outline, blue pinstripes, and Seaver's 41 in blue outlined in orange.

On March 29, 2021, Mets owner Steve Cohen announced that the team would bring back the black jerseys for "a few games" later in the 2021 season.  On July 15, the Mets announced that the black jerseys would be worn in Friday home games starting on July 30 for the remainder of the 2021 regular season.  The jerseys featured the standard primary-logo patch on the left sleeve, matching the original black jerseys from 1998, and were worn with plain white pants with blue piping and the all-black caps and batting helmets used from 1999-2012. The Mets brought back the black jerseys, without the blue piping, as a full-season Friday home alternate for 2022, and discontinued the blue alternate road jersey and cap.  Also in 2022, after one game wearing the blue home alternate jerseys with pinstriped pants (as they had done since 2015) the Mets switched to the plain white pants with blue piping for the blue home alternates.

"Throwbacks" and special uniforms
The Mets wore their first "throwback" (or "Turn Back the Clock") uniform, a 1962 replica, for a game against the Cincinnati Reds at Shea Stadium on August 30, 1992. The jerseys had the primary-logo patch on the left sleeve even though it was not actually used on the home jersey in the Mets' inaugural season.

In 1999, the Mets wore gray flannel 1969 replica uniforms for a road game against the Tampa Bay Devil Rays on July 17. Ten days later, most (albeit not all) MLB teams including the Mets participated in a "Turn Ahead the Clock" promotion, with futuristic uniform designs. The Mets, playing at home against the Pittsburgh Pirates, were branded as the "Mercury Mets" in reference to the planet Mercury, wearing black caps with the planetary symbol in silver as the team's logo. The jerseys were black with silver-trimmed armscyes, and had the word "Mercury" in silver appearing horizontally across the top of the chest with "METS" in vertically-stacked capitals on the player's left side. Below the word "Mercury" on the player's right side was an image of the  symbol hovering above and casting its shadow upon a generic gray cratered planetoid. On the back of the jersey, the player's name and number were rendered in silver, with the player's name to the right of the number written vertically from top to bottom. (Pitcher Jason Isringhausen's name was too long to fit this design template, so his jersey read "IZZY" instead, the only time in Mets history a player's nickname appeared in place of his surname on the back of a jersey until MLB's first Players Weekend promotion, discussed below, in 2017.)

A 1969 "throwback" home uniform was worn on April 25, 2000, for a home game against the Cincinnati Reds.

On July 15, 2001, for a home game against the Toronto Blue Jays, the Mets wore replica uniforms of the 1947 New York Cubans of the Negro leagues. These uniforms were white with red piping on the placket, shoulders, sleeve cuffs and pants. Across the chest was "NEW YORK" in red lettering, angled upward, above a black silhouetted baseball bat, with "CUBANS" inscribed horizontally underneath with the letter "C" encircling the end of the bat. The caps were black with a red bill and the Mets' "NY" crest in red. The Mets would dress as the Cubans again for Negro league tribute games in subsequent seasons. On June 13, 2004 at Kansas City, July 9, 2005 at Pittsburgh, and August 11, 2006 at Washington, they appeared as the 1944 Cubans in gray uniforms with black piping on the placket, sleeve cuffs and pants, "NEW YORK" in red in radially-arched sans-serif capitals across the chest, and "CUBANS" in vertically-stacked capitals on the left sleeve. The caps were black with a red bill and the "NY" crest in red outlined in white. These were worn again, without the white outline on the cap logo, on May 29, 2010 at Pittsburgh. Later that season, on August 21 at Milwaukee, the Mets wore a Cubans uniform that was gray with red piping, red cap, and lettering resembling the 1947 version worn in 2001, as described above.

In 2002, the Mets wore 1986 replica uniforms for home games against the Florida Marlins on July 15 and 16. The uniforms featured pullover jerseys with "racing stripes" similar to the 1983–1990 style but without the 25th-Anniversary sleeve patch worn in 1986. On August 19 and 20, 2006, the Mets again wore 1986 replicas, this time with the 25th-Anniversary sleeve patch, at Shea Stadium against the Colorado Rockies.

From 2007–2014, the Mets celebrated "Hispanic Heritage Night" once each season with a special jersey, featuring the phrase "Los Mets" in place of the traditional "Mets" wordmark. From 2007–09, the "Los" was simply added to the home white alternate jersey in miniature cursive script, blue with orange outline and black drop-shadow, just above and to the left (from the viewer's perspective) of the "M" in "Mets"; in 2010 they did the same with the home pinstriped jerseys. In 2011, the team created an alternate jersey that was blue with orange placket piping, orange numerals and lettering outlined in white, a "Los Mets" wordmark in cursive script across the chest, angled upward, with "Los" on the player's right placket and "Mets" on the left above the numeral. In 2012 the blue jersey was used again, this time with white numerals and lettering outlined in orange. The 2013 "Los Mets" jersey was orange, with blue lettering outlined in white and blue piping, worn with the home alternate cap and the All-Star Game patch on the left sleeve. The orange "Los Mets" jersey returned in 2014, this time with the standard cap and the "Mr. Met" sleeve patch.

In 2009, for three games in mid-August against the San Francisco Giants at Citi Field, the Mets wore a "fauxback" (i.e., resembling the past or a particular era in style but not matching an actual previous uniform) designed to honor the old New York Giants. The uniform was off-white/cream-colored and displayed the letters "N Y" in large thick royal-blue capitals, in Tiffany typeface, on the front of the jersey on either side of the placket, with plain blue serif block numerals on the back. On the right sleeve was a patch depicting the team's mascot, "Mr. Met", in a running pose facing to the right of the viewer toward the front of the uniform. The jersey had thin blue-orange-blue striping around the collar and sleeve cuffs, and the pants had thin blue piping down the sides from hip to cuff. This uniform was worn with the Mets' standard blue caps and helmets, blue socks and undersleeves, and black belts.

The Mets wore replicas of their 1989 road uniforms for a game at San Diego on August 3, 2012, adding the 2012 Gary Carter memorial patch to the right sleeve of the "throwback" jersey.

On April 16, 2013, the Mets wore replicas of their 1993 home uniforms in the second game of a doubleheader against the Colorado Rockies at Coors Field. Although the Mets were the visitors, the Rockies were commemorating the first game in franchise history which took place at Shea Stadium on April 5, 1993, so the Rockies wore replicas of their original road uniforms for the occasion.

In 2014, the Mets once again paid tribute to the Negro leagues, this time as the Brooklyn Royal Giants for a game at Pittsburgh on June 28. The uniforms were royal blue with orange piping on the shoulders, sleeves and pants, and "ROYAL GIANTS" in thick orange capitals across the chest ("ROYAL" above "GIANTS"). The caps were also royal blue, with a large interlocking "RG" crest in orange. The jerseys had a circular patch on the left sleeve, the top part showing the orange "RG" logo on a blue background and the bottom part showing "ROYAL GIANTS" in serif capitals above "Brooklyn" in italic script, on a white background. These uniforms appeared again on June 20, 2015 and June 25, 2016, at Atlanta.

On July 20, 2016, the Mets wore replicas of their 1986 road uniforms for a game against the Chicago Cubs at Wrigley Field.

On September 11, 2021, the twentieth anniversary of the 9/11 attacks, in a home game against the Yankees, the Mets wore first-responder caps and special uniforms resembling the 1999-2011 home white alternates, with the road "NEW YORK" wordmark in place of the "Mets" script, an American flag patch on the back of the collar, and the "9-11-01" embroidery used in 2001-02 on the right sleeve. The batting helmets resembled the two-tone helmets used from 1998-2005, with an American flag decal above the left ear.

MLB-wide holiday and special event uniforms
Beginning in 2013, MLB teams began wearing special uniforms on certain holidays and holiday weekends, with every team incorporating the same color and design scheme into its own uniform graphics template. The first such event was Memorial Day 2013 (May 27); the Mets' home pinstriped jerseys were modified with desert camouflage in place of blue in the wordmark, numerals, and lettering, outlined in orange. The team also wore desert-camouflage caps with the "NY" logo in orange outlined in blue. For Memorial Day 2014 (May 26), the team modified its home white alternate jerseys with the same graphics scheme, and the caps had an orange bill. The team used the home pinstriped jerseys again, with the same modifications, for Memorial Day 2015.

MLB teams also modified their uniforms for Independence Day in 2015. The Mets, playing on the road in grey, had the "NEW YORK" wordmark and player numerals in navy blue with small red-outlined white stars, outlined in red; player names on the back were rendered in thin red block lettering. An American flag patch was worn on the right sleeve. The caps were also navy blue with a sublimated American-flag pattern, the "NY" logo in white outlined in navy and orange.

For Mother's Day 2016 (May 8), the graphics on the Mets' road grey jerseys were pink outlined in dark charcoal-grey. The caps were dark grey with the "NY" crest in pink. The 2016 Memorial Day (May 30) jerseys were the home pinstripes with graphics in woodland-camouflage outlined in black. The caps were also woodland-camouflage, with the "NY" crest in blue outlined in orange. MLB teams also wore special uniforms for Father's Day 2016 (June 19); here the graphics were light blue outlined in dark grey, and the caps dark grey with the "NY" crest in light blue. The Mets' Independence Day design for 2016 had red graphics outlined in navy blue, and an American Flag patch on the right sleeve. For each of the 2016 special-event jerseys, player names were rendered in thin block lettering in the graphics-outline color, and the primary-logo patches on the left sleeve were modified to match the respective color schemes.

MLB teams used similar designs for the same holidays in 2017, although this time the special uniforms were worn for the entire holiday weekend. In addition to the foregoing holidays, MLB had a "Players Weekend" promotion on August 25–27 in which each team wore uniforms inspired by Little League Baseball, with each player having a nickname in place of his surname on the back of the jersey. The Mets' Players Weekend jerseys were blue with orange sleeves, the "Mets" script in orange outlined in white across the chest, no numerals on the front, and plain orange serif block numerals on the back with the player's nickname in radially-arched white block lettering. The caps were orange, with the "NY" crest in light blue outlined in white.

For Mother's Day 2018 (May 13), the Mets wore their regular road grey jerseys with a pink ribbon on the upper left chest; the cap was pink with a blue bill, blue top-button, and blue "NY" crest outlined in orange. The Memorial Day uniforms had olive-drab lettering outlined in black, black caps with a sublimated camouflage pattern, an olive-drab bill, the "NY" crest in black outlined in olive drab, and five olive-drab stars embroidered on the right side of the cap in a horizontal row. The Father's Day design echoed the Mother's Day design, with light blue in place of pink and a plain blue cap logo. For Independence Day, the jerseys had the star-spangled navy blue lettering outlined in red, and an American Flag patch on the right sleeve, with the Rusty Staub memorial patch moved to the front of the jersey above "YORK" by the player's left shoulder; the caps were navy blue with an American Flag-patterned "NY" crest outlined in gold, and the National League logo on the right side of the cap. The Players Weekend (August 24–26) jerseys carried over from 2017, with the cap logo and bill changed to royal blue.

MLB's 2019 special-event uniforms were announced on April 12, 2019. The Mets' Mother's Day cap, worn on Sunday, May 12, was royal blue with a pink bill and logo crest; teams again wore their regular jerseys with a pink ribbon patch on the upper left chest. MLB teams also recognized Armed Forces Day in 2019, on May 17–19, wearing military-themed caps with a jungle-camouflage crown and bill; the Mets' "NY" logo was rendered in olive drab outlined in khaki. On the upper left chest of the jersey was a circular patch consisting of the MLB logo with stars and stripes in its blue and red color fields, surrounded by a thick red circle with the words "ARMED FORCES DAY" circumscribed in white serif lettering through the top of the circle. For Memorial Day, May 27, the jerseys featured a patch on the upper left chest depicting a red poppy with green leaves, and a black banner across the lower half of the flower reading "LEST WE FORGET" in white sans-serif letters; the circular patch from the Armed Forces Day jerseys, marked "MEMORIAL DAY" here, appeared on the right side of the caps. The Father's Day caps, worn on Sunday, June 16, had a tie-dyed-looking blue crown, with a royal blue bill and logo crest, and the jerseys had a powder-blue ribbon patch on the upper left chest. The Mets' Fourth of July caps, which they wore on July 5–7, were navy blue with a red bill, the "NY" logo showing stars on top and stripes on the bottom, outlined in gold. The aforementioned circular patch was on the upper left chest of the jersey, marked "INDEPENDENCE DAY". The Mets' Players' Weekend uniforms (August 23–25) were all white, with white graphics outlined in silver, "Mets" script on the front and serif block numerals on the back, nicknames in silver block lettering, and white caps and batting helmets with silver "NY" logos; pitchers wore black caps with black logos. On the left sleeve was a black circular patch with the number "45" in white, a memorial to Los Angeles Angels pitcher Tyler Skaggs who died on July 1, 2019.

There were no holiday or special-event uniforms worn in 2020, as the MLB season was delayed until July 23 and shortened to 60 games due to the COVID-19 pandemic. For Mother's Day 2021 (May 9), the Mets wore their standard home uniforms with a pink "NY" logo on the cap, and pink-ribbon symbols on the right side of the cap and the upper-left front of the jersey. The following weekend (May 14–16), the Mets marked Armed Forces Day by wearing camouflage caps with a white "NY" crest outlined in black, and a black rectangular patch with rounded corners on the right side of the cap containing three lines of text: the first line has "NEW YORK" in white lettering and "METS" in black lettering inside a white rectangle; the second and third lines read "NATIONAL LEAGUE" and "MAJOR LEAGUE BASEBALL" respectively in white lettering, underscored by five white stars. On the jersey front, above "YORK" on the player's left side, is a circular patch showing a red circle with "ARMED FORCES DAY" circumscribed in white lettering in the upper half, and a stars-and-stripes version of the MLB logo in the center. On Memorial Day (May 31), the Mets again wore the red-poppy patch from 2019 on the upper left chest and the circular MLB holiday patch on the right side of the cap. The 2021 Father's Day cap had a light blue "NY" crest and ribbon graphic on the right side of the cap. For Independence Day weekend (July 2–4), the Mets wore navy blue caps with the "NY" crest having a white outline around a navy-and-red American-flag pattern, and on the right side of the cap were the letters "NY" in white outlined in red, radially arched above the letters "USA" in white flanked by a white star on each side.

On Mother's Day (May 8) 2022, in both games of a doubleheader at Philadelphia, the Mets wore pink-ribbon symbols on the upper-left front of the grey road jerseys, and grey caps with pink "NY" logos outlined in white. For the weekend of Armed Forces Day (May 21-22), the Mets wore jungle-camouflage caps with the "NY" crest in an olive-and-khaki sublimated American-flag pattern outlined in pale yellow, and a rectangular patch on the right side of the cap, black outlined in khaki with pale yellow graphics, a six-star pattern on the left and the word "NEW YORK" on the right between two horizontal stripes. On Memorial Day (May 30) the Mets wore the red-poppy patch on the upper left chest, but no holiday patch on the cap.

References

External links
Dressed to the Nines – National Baseball Hall of Fame
Chris Creamer's sportslogos.net
Uniforms
Full Uniform History

New York Mets
Mets